Potamiscus is the type genus of freshwater crabs in the subfamily Potamiscinae: recorded from Asian countries including China and Vietnam.

Species
 Potamiscus annandali (Alcock, 1909)
 Potamiscus cangyuanensis Dai, 1999
 Potamiscus decourcyi (Kemp, 1913)
 Potamiscus elaphrius Dai, G.-X. Chen, J.-B. Liu, Luo, Yi, Z.-H. Liu, Gu & C.-H. Liu, 1990
 Potamiscus loshingensis (H. W. Wu, 1934)
 Potamiscus montosus Dai, Y. Z. Song, He, Cao, Z. B. Xu & Zhong, 1975
 Potamiscus motuoensis Dai, 1990
 Potamiscus pealianus (Wood-Mason, 1871)
 Potamiscus rangoonensis (Rathbun, 1904)
 Potamiscus rongjingensis Dai, G.-X. Chen, J.-B. Liu, Luo, Yi, Z.-H. Liu, Gu & C.-H. Liu, 1990
 Potamiscus tumidulus (Alcock, 1909)
 Potamiscus yiwuensis Dai & Cai, 1998
 Potamiscus yongshengensis Dai & G.-X. Chen, 1985
 Potamiscus yunnanensis (Kemp, 1924)

References

External links

Potamoidea
Freshwater crustaceans of Asia